Trilateration is the use of distances (or "ranges") for determining the unknown position coordinates of a point of interest, often around Earth (geopositioning).
When more than three distances are involved, it may be called multilateration, for emphasis.

The distances or ranges might be ordinary Euclidean distances (slant ranges) or spherical distances (scaled central angles), as in true-range multilateration; or biased distances (pseudo-ranges), as in pseudo-range multilateration.

Trilateration or multilateration should not be confused with triangulation, which uses angles for positioning; and direction finding, which determines the line of sight direction to a target without determining the radial distance.

Terminology
Multiple, sometimes overlapping and conflicting terms are employed for similar concepts – e.g., multilateration without modification has been used for aviation systems employing both true-ranges and pseudo-ranges.  Moreover, different fields of endeavor may employ different terms. In geometry, trilateration is defined as the process of determining absolute or relative locations of points by measurement of distances, using the geometry of circles, spheres or triangles. In surveying, trilateration is a specific technique.

True-range multilateration

Pseudo-range multilateration

References

Geometry
Geopositioning